Boil Point (‘Nos Boil’ \'nos bo-'il\) is the point forming the west side of the entrance to Retizhe Cove on the south coast of Trinity Peninsula in Graham Land, Antarctica.

The point is named after the settlement of Boil in Northeastern Bulgaria.

Location
German-British mapping in 1996.

Maps
 Trinity Peninsula. Scale 1:250000 topographic map No. 5697. Institut für Angewandte Geodäsie and British Antarctic Survey, 1996.
 Antarctic Digital Database (ADD). Scale 1:250000 topographic map of Antarctica. Scientific Committee on Antarctic Research (SCAR), 1993–2016.

References
 Boil Point. SCAR Composite Antarctic Gazetteer
 Bulgarian Antarctic Gazetteer. Antarctic Place-names Commission. (details in Bulgarian, basic data in English)

External links
 Boil Point. Copernix satellite image

Headlands of Trinity Peninsula
Bulgaria and the Antarctic